The E Line is one of seven RapidRide lines (limited-stop routes with some bus rapid transit features) operated by King County Metro in King County, Washington. The E Line began service on February 15, 2014, running between Aurora Village Transit Center in Shoreline and Pioneer Square, Seattle in Downtown Seattle. The line runs mainly via Aurora Avenue N and 3rd Ave.

At the Aurora Village Transit Center passengers can connect to Community Transit's Swift Bus Rapid Transit to Everett Station.

History
This corridor was previously served by King County Metro route 358 express which carried an average of 11,730 riders on weekdays during the last month in service making it King County Metro's second busiest route. In 2011, drivers on Route 358 wrote up 333 "security incident reports", leading the Seattle Weekly to give the route the title of "Most Dangerous Bus Route in Seattle" Security cameras were installed on all RapidRide buses and lighting was improved at stations, in part, to address this problem.

In early 2013 King County Metro began construction on new enhanced bus stops, new bus stations and making upgrades to traffic signals along Aurora Ave N. Service on the RapidRide E Line was scheduled to start in Fall 2013 but the opening was delayed until February 15, 2014, to give crews more time to finish construction.

The only change made to the routing during the conversion to RapidRide was in Green Lake. Route 358 exited Highway 99 to serve stops on Linden Ave N, but a new bus stop on Aurora Ave N allows southbound buses to stay on the highway (northbound buses must still deviate).

King County Metro planned to begin service on the RapidRide E Line in September 2013, but the opening was pushed back several months to February 2014 due to delays in construction.

Since the implementation of RapidRide on the corridor, ridership has grown 35 percent and the E Line served an average of 15,800 riders on weekdays in spring 2015, the most of any Metro bus route.

Service

References

External links
E Line website
RapidRide website
RapidRide Blog
King County Metro

Bus transportation in Washington (state)
Transportation in King County, Washington
Transportation in Seattle
2014 establishments in Washington (state)
2014 in transport
King County Metro